Stützerbach is a village and a former municipality in the Ilm-Kreis district, in Thuringia, Germany. Since 1 January 2019, it is part of the town Ilmenau.

History 
Within the German Empire (1871-1918), part of Stützerbach belonged to the Prussian Province of Saxony and part to the Grand Duchy of Saxe-Weimar-Eisenach.

References

Ilm-Kreis
Grand Duchy of Saxe-Weimar-Eisenach
Former municipalities in Thuringia